The Armenian Olympic Committee (ARMNOC) is responsible for Armenia's participation in the Olympic Games. It is headquartered in Yerevan.

History 
The Armenian Olympic Committee was founded in 1990. The committee became a member of the International Olympic Committee in 1993 and subsequently became a member of the European Olympic Committees, among other international sports organizations.

List of presidents

Executive committee 
The committee of the ARMNOC is represented by: 
 President: Gagik Tsarukyan
 Vice Presidents: Vahram Arakelyan, Hoksen Mirzoyan, Derenik Gabrielyan
 Secretary General: Hrachya Rostomyan
 Members: Ishkhan Zakaryan, Harutyun Kushkyan, Samvel Khachatryan, Vardevan Grigoryan, Hripsime Jilavyan, Levon Julfalakyan, Israel Militosyan, Hakob Panosyan, Albert Azaryan

Member federations 
The Armenian National Federations are the organizations that coordinate all aspects of their individual sports. They are responsible for training, competition and development of their sports. There are currently 20 Olympic Summer and three Winter Sport Federations and four Non-Olympic Sports Federations in Armenia.

Olympic Sport federations

Non-Olympic Sport federations

Olympavan training complex 

Olympavan is the official training centre of the Armenian Olympic Committee, located in the Davtashen District of the capital Yerevan. Following a 2-year period of construction process between 2013 and 2015, the Olympavan was officially opened on 29 September 2015, on the occasion of the 25th anniversary of the Armenian Olympic Committee. The ceremony was attended by then-Prime Minister Hovik Abrahamyan, businessman Samvel Karapetyan, Sheikh Ahmed Al-Fahad Al-Sabah, Gagik Tsarukyan, as well as delegates of 25 different national Olympic committees.

The complex occupies an area of 10,000 m2 and consists of 5 buildings. Building 1 is the administrative centre of the Armenian Olympic Committee, home to the administrative offices, meeting rooms and conference halls.

The first floor of building 2 is home to the weightlifting training hall, the anti-doping clinic, the centre's spa, and the fitness and bodybuilding gymnasium. The 2nd floor is home to the judo, boxing and wrestling training halls.

Building 3 is home to the hotel of the complex designated to accommodate more than 300 athletes with 121 guestrooms, restaurants and other services.

Building 4 is home to an indoor arena with 250 seats, used for basketball, volleyball, handball and futsal.

Building 5 is home to the indoor swimming pool with its diving facilities. It was officially opened on 27 September 2017 by Sheikh Ahmed Al-Fahad Al-Sabah and Gagik Tsarukyan.

The president of the International Olympic Committee Mr. Thomas Bach visited the centre during the final phases of the construction process in 2014.

See also 

 Armenia at the Olympics
 Armenian Paralympic Committee
 Armenian Student Sports Federation
 European Olympic Committees
 Sport in Armenia

References

External links 
Official website
Profile at olympic.org

National Olympic Committees
Olympic
Armenia at the Olympics
1990 establishments in Armenia
Sports organizations established in 1990